The 1907–08 season was Chelsea Football Club's third competitive season and third year in existence. The club played their first ever season in the top-flight, finishing 13th.

Table

References

External links
 Chelsea 1907–08 season at stamford-bridge.com

1907-08
English football clubs 1907–08 season